Gaya is a Local Government Area in Kano State, Nigeria. Its headquarters are in the town of Gaya in the north of the area.

It has an area of 613 km and a population of 201,016 in the 2006 census.

The postal code of the area is 713.

History
Gaya is the oldest and most significant site in Kano's history and precedes the foundation of Kano itself. Gaya is believed to be the origin of a man named Kano who first settled in the present Kano State on his search for ironstone. The earliest known settlers of Kano were known as "Abagayawa". Gaya served as an important terminus of a migratory corridor through which there was an influx of immigrating peoples especially from Eastern Sudan, the Maghrib and the Middle East. Bagauda and his people were said to have passed through Gaya before making their way to Dala and establishing the Kingdom of Kano in 999 CE. Gaya was soon absorbed into the newly founded Kingdom by its adventurous new rulers and would become one of the most influential provinces in the State.

Traditional state
The traditional ruler of Gaya is known as the Sarkin Gaya. The present Sarkin Gaya, Alhaji Ibrahim Abdulkadir Gaya (born in 1930) has been on the throne since his appointment in 1990. In May, 2019, he was elevated to the rank of Emir, along with three other traditional rulers. Prior to his enthronement as Sarkin Gaya he Alhaji Ibrahim Gaya was previously the district head of Kunchi and then Minjibir.

References

Gaya, Nigeria Page. Falling Rain Genomics, Inc. 1996–2004. Retrieved 2009-03-25.
 

Local Government Areas in Kano State